Rachel Cecilia Adams (born 9 August 1963) is a South African politician from the African National Congress. She is a member of the National Assembly of South Africa from the Northern Cape.

References 

1963 births
Living people
Members of the National Assembly of South Africa
African National Congress politicians
Women members of the National Assembly of South Africa
People from the Northern Cape
21st-century South African politicians
21st-century South African women politicians